Mortal Inheritance is a Nigerian film produced by Zeb Ejiro, directed by Andy Amenechi and written by Bond Emeruwa.

Plot
Mortal Inheritance is a romantic drama about a woman dealing with sickle-cell anaemia, the plot also delves into cultural resistance to inter ethnic marriages in Nigeria.  The protagonist of the story is Kemi, a Yoruba lady with sickle cell anemia, the part was played by Omotola Jalade-Ekeinde. She beat the odds of dying young as a sickle cell carrier and upon reaching adulthood, she fell in love with Chike, an Igbo man. But when she realised that Chike has the AS genotype or a sickle cell trait, she ended the relationship.

See also
List of Nigerian films

References

External links
 
 Mortal Inheritance at Reel Illustrated

Nigerian romantic drama films
1996 films
English-language Nigerian films
1990s English-language films